Sikhs are a religious minority in the Netherlands.  They number around 12,000 and most of them live in or around Amsterdam. There are Seven gurudwaras in the Netherlands.

Gurdwaras
Gurdwara Shri Guru Nanak Dev Ji, Rotterdam 
Shri Guru Nanak Gurdwara, Amsterdam
Sikh vereniging Sri Guru Singh Sabha, The Hague
Guru Ram Das Ashram, Amsterdam
Gurdwara Sikh Sangat Sahib, Almere Haven
Gurudwara Maansarovar Sahib, Amsterdam
Gurdwara Shri Guru Ravidass Sabha, The Hague
Gurdwara Shri Guru Ravidass temple, Amsterdam
Gurdwara Guru Maneyo Granth, Eindhoven, Geldrop

References

External links
 Sikhs in the Netherlands
G urudwaras in Netherlands

Religion in the Netherlands
Netherlands
Neth